"A Trick of the Night" is a mid-tempo ballad recorded by English girl group Bananarama. It was written and produced by Steve Jolley and Tony Swain and released as the final single from Bananarama's album True Confessions.

The song was re-recorded for UK single release, with new synthesizer tracks and vocal arrangement by the Stock Aitken Waterman (SAW) production trio, at the request of London Records for the UK release. The song was included on the CD version of Greatest Hits Collection as a bonus track; it was not included on the vinyl version nor their 2001 compilation The Very Best of Bananarama. 

The Number One Mix, the single remix, and related variations interpolated the music of Princess' "Say I'm Your Number One". Lyrics from the Number One Mix, were sampled on Bananarama's "I Heard a Rumour" B-side song "Clean-Cut Boy".

Background
The band named the track as their favourite song from True Confessions, but its release was deprioritized behind "MoreThan Physical", due to the record company's concerns about the act's ability to chart strongly with a ballad.

The cautionary message in the lyrics are directed towards a male friend who has left home to seek his fortune in the big city but is experiencing challenges and facing the prospect of becoming a rentboy.

Music video
Two videos were filmed for the song. The North American version, directed by Andy Morahan, featured Bananarama singing the song in a house at night, with their images projected on to movie screens. 

The release of the single in the UK was delayed until February 1987, so that Bananarama could participate in a BBC television show called In at the Deep End. Each week Chris Serle or Paul Heiney would have to master a new skill - in this case, Paul Heiney had to master the art of directing a pop music video (the episode was similar to MTV's Making the Video programme) for this song. Group members Sara Dallin, Siobhan Fahey and Keren Woodward hated the final product. “The video is just the worst," said Sarah. "I don’t want people to think this is our idea of a good video."

Track listings

 US 7-inch London Records/Polygram 886 119-7
"A Trick of the Night" (US Single version) 4:22
"A Cut Above the Rest" (Album version) 3:40 S. Jolley/T. Swain/S. Dallin/S. Fahey/K. Woodward

 US 12-inch single 886 119-1
"A Trick of the Night" (The Number One Mix) - (8:13) 
Remixed by Stock/Aitken/Waterman
"A Trick of the Night" (Tricky Mix) - (7:15)
Remixed by Jolley & Swain
"A Trick of the Night" (Dub Mix) - (4:31)
Remixed by Stock/Aitken/Waterman

 UK 7-inch single NANA12
"A Trick of the Night" (Single Version) 4:06
Available on the CD album The Greatest Hits Collection
"A Trick of the Night" (Tricky Mix - Edit)

 UK 7-inch EP single NANEP12
"A Trick of the Night" (Single Version)  4:06
"A Cut Above the Rest"  3:40
"A Trick of the Night" (Alternative 7-inch Number One Edit)  4:27
"Set on You"  3:56
M. Stock/M. Aitken/P. Waterman/S. Dallin/S. Fahey/K. Woodward

 UK 7-inch picture disc NANPD12
"A Trick of the Night" (Single Version)  4:06
"A Trick of the Night" (Tricky Mix - Edit)

 UK 12-inch single NANX12
"A Trick of the Night" (The Number One Mix)  8:14
Available on the CD album The Twelve Inches of Bananarama
"A Trick of the Night" (Tricky Mix)  7:15
"Set on You"  3:56

 UK promo 12-inch single NANDJ 12
"A Trick of the Night" (Dub Mix)  4:31
"A Trick of the Night" (Instrumental)  4:13 #:Remixed by Stock/Aitken/Waterman

 Other versions
"A Trick of the Night" (Album Version) - (4:38) 
Taken from the album True Confessions
"A Trick of the Night" (UK Video Version) - (4:20)
Available on the remastered 2007 True Confessions but mistakenly listed as (Single Version)
"A Trick of the Night" (US Video Version) - (4:14)

Personnel
Bananarama
Sara Dallin - Vocals
Siobhan Fahey - Vocals
Keren Woodward - Vocals

Additional musicians
Tony Swain – keyboards
Steve Jolley – guitar
Keith Thomas – sax

Charts
"A Trick of the Night" was a top-40 hit in the UK, peaking at number 32. The SAW-remixed version received the most airplay in their home country, while the ballad version stalled at number 76 on the U.S. Billboard Hot 100.  The single spent one week in the Australian Kent Music Report top 100 singles chart, where it peaked at number 99.  "A Trick of the Night" peaked at number 24 in Ireland.

Popular culture
It was included on the soundtrack to the 1986 American film Jumpin' Jack Flash.

References

1986 songs
1986 singles
Bananarama songs
London Records singles
Music videos directed by Andy Morahan
Songs written by Tony Swain (musician)
Songs written by Steve Jolley (songwriter)
Song recordings produced by Jolley & Swain